Gerardus Franciscus Tebroke (9 November 1949 – 19 March 1995) was a runner from the Netherlands. He competed at the 1980 Summer Olympics in 10,000 m and finished in 14th place. 

In 1978, Tebroke set new national records in 5,000 m (13'21.68) and 10,000 m (27'36.64), which stood until 1997 and 2000. He died unexpectedly from an intracranial hemorrhage. Since 1996, a regular (annual or biennial) running competition is carried out in Aalten in his honor.

References

External links
Gerard TEBROKE. les-sports.info

1949 births
1995 deaths
Athletes (track and field) at the 1980 Summer Olympics
Dutch male long-distance runners
Olympic athletes of the Netherlands
Sportspeople from Enschede